The 1961 Boston College Eagles baseball team represented Boston College in the 1961 NCAA University Division baseball season. The Eagles played their home games at John Shea Field. The team was coached by Eddie Pellagrini in his 4th year at Boston College.

The Eagles won the District I Playoff to advanced to the College World Series, where they were defeated by the Southern California Trojans.

Roster

Schedule 

! style="" | Regular Season
|- valign="top" 

|- align="center" bgcolor="#ccffcc"
| 1 || April 13 || at  || Unknown • Cambridge, Massachusetts || 14–1 || 1–0 || 1–0
|- align="center" bgcolor="#ccffcc"
| 2 || April 19 ||  || John Shea Field • Boston, Massachusetts || 11–0 || 2–0 || 2–0
|- align="center" bgcolor="#ccffcc"
| 3 || April 21 ||  || John Shea Field • Boston, Massachusetts || 7–0 || 3–0 || 2–0
|- align="center" bgcolor="#ccffcc"
| 4 || April 22 || at  || Unknown • Providence, Rhode Island || 11–6 || 4–0 || 2–0
|- align="center" bgcolor="#ccffcc"
| 5 || April 27 || at  || Unknown • Medford, Massachusetts || 7–2 || 5–0 || 3–0
|- align="center" bgcolor="#ffcccc"
| 6 || April 29 || at  || Unknown • Waterville, Maine || 2–4 || 5–1 || 3–0
|-

|- align="center" bgcolor="#ccffcc"
| 7 || May 4 ||  || John Shea Field • Boston, Massachusetts || 6–2 || 6–1 || 4–0
|- align="center" bgcolor="#ccffcc"
| 8 || May 6 ||  || John Shea Field • Boston, Massachusetts || 8–5 || 7–1 || 5–0
|- align="center" bgcolor="#ccffcc"
| 9 || May 6 || Northeastern || John Shea Field • Boston, Massachusetts || 3–0 || 8–1 || 6–0
|- align="center" bgcolor="#ccffcc"
| 10 || May 8 ||  || John Shea Field • Boston, Massachusetts || 3–1 || 9–1 || 7–0
|- align="center" bgcolor="#ccffcc"
| 11 || May 11 || Tufts || John Shea Field • Boston, Massachusetts || 6–0 || 10–1 || 8–0
|- align="center" bgcolor="#ffcccc"
| 12 || May 13 || at  || Unknown • Springfield, Massachusetts || 5–8 || 10–2 || 8–0
|- align="center" bgcolor="#ffcccc"
| 13 || May 20 || Providence || John Shea Field • Boston, Massachusetts || 1–4 || 10–3 || 8–1
|- align="center" bgcolor="#ccffcc"
| 14 || May  ||  || John Shea Field • Boston, Massachusetts || 3–2 || 11–3 || 8–1
|- align="center" bgcolor="#ccffcc"
| 15 || May 30 || at  || Fitton Field • Worcester, Massachusetts || 16–1 || 12–3 || 8–1
|-

|-
|-
! style="" | Postseason
|- valign="top"

|- align="center" bgcolor="#ccffcc"
| 16 || June  || vs Springfield || AIC Park • Springfield, Massachusetts || 11–8 || 13–3 || 8–1
|- align="center" bgcolor="#ccffcc"
| 17 || June  || vs  || AIC Park • Springfield, Massachusetts || 4–1 || 14–3 || 8–1
|- align="center" bgcolor="#ffcccc"
| 18 || June  || vs Connecticut || AIC Park • Springfield, Massachusetts || 2–3 || 14–4 || 8–1
|- align="center" bgcolor="#ffcccc"
| 19 || June  || vs Connecticut || AIC Park • Springfield, Massachusetts || 14–4 || 15–4 || 8–1
|-

|- align="center" bgcolor="#ccffcc"
| 20 || June 9 || Holy Cross || John Shea Field • Boston, Massachusetts || 5–2 || 16–4 || 9–1
|-

|- align="center" bgcolor="#ccffcc"
| 21 || June 10 || vs Western Michigan Broncos || Omaha Municipal Stadium • Omaha, Nebraska || 3–2 || 17–4 || 9–1
|- align="center" bgcolor="#ffcccc"
| 22 || June 11 || vs Southern California || Omaha Municipal Stadium • Omaha, Nebraska || 3–10 || 17–5 || 9–1
|- align="center" bgcolor="#ccffcc"
| 23 || June 12 || vs Duke || Omaha Municipal Stadium • Omaha, Nebraska || 4–3 || 18–5 || 9–1
|- align="center" bgcolor="#ffcccc"
| 24 || June 13 || vs Southern California || Omaha Municipal Stadium • Omaha, Nebraska || 3–4 || 18–6 || 9–1
|-

|-
|

References 

Boston College Eagles baseball seasons
Boston College Eagles baseball
College World Series seasons
Boston College
1960s in Boston